The canton of Rombas is an administrative division of the Moselle department, northeastern France. Its borders were modified at the French canton reorganisation which came into effect in March 2015. Its seat is in Rombas.

It consists of the following communes:
 
Amanvillers
Amnéville
Bronvaux
Fèves
Marange-Silvange
Montois-la-Montagne
Norroy-le-Veneur
Pierrevillers
Plesnois
Rombas
Roncourt
Sainte-Marie-aux-Chênes
Saint-Privat-la-Montagne
Saulny

References

Cantons of Moselle (department)